Guido Ghedina (17 January 1931 – 20 June 1976) was an Italian alpine skier. He competed in two events at the 1956 Winter Olympics.

References

External links
 

1931 births
1976 deaths
Italian male alpine skiers
Olympic alpine skiers of Italy
Alpine skiers at the 1956 Winter Olympics
People from Cortina d'Ampezzo
Sportspeople from the Province of Belluno